Ptinus tectus, often called the Australian spider beetle, is a species of beetle in the family Ptinidae, or family Anobiidae, subfamily Ptininae. It is a cosmopolitan species (arrived in Europe and the UK from Australia in 1900). It is a pest of stored foods and museum specimens.

P. tectus Boieldieu, 1856 is the name most often used for this species. Some works still state Ptinus ocellus Brown, 1929.

Biology

Description
The Australian spider beetle (Pictus tectus) measures  2.5–4 mm in length and is coloured dark brown. The adults have biting mouthparts, a well developed thorax and 11-segmented antennae. Characteristics which give them a spider-like appearance include a stout body, pronounced constriction of the neck shield and 6 long thin legs with 5-segmented tarsi.

Life cycle
The female Australian spider beetle lays 100–120 sticky eggs over a period of 4–5 weeks in early summer, either singly or in small batches. At 20–25 °C the eggs hatch in 3–16 days, producing larvae which are fleshy, curved, covered with fine hairs and relatively immobile. Larval development takes at least 6 weeks, during which time the larvae moult 4 or 5 times. When mature, they wander in search of a pupation site where they spin a cocoon cell in which to pupate. Adults emerge after 20 to 30 days and will live for as long 12 months.

At 70% R.H. development of Ptinus tectus from egg laying to emergence from the cocoon takes an average of about 62 days at 23–25 °C; at 15 °C the time taken is about 130 days. The minimum temperature at which complete development can occur is 10 °C and the maximum is between 28 and 30 °C. Considerable mortality occurs in eggs and larvae at 28 °C.

Domestic pest
The species is considered as a pest in museums. It is recorded from at least 55 museums and historic houses in the United Kingdom.

References

External links
Padil Diagnostic images (as P. ocellus Brown, 1929)
Ptinus tectus UK distribution at National Biodiverity Network Gateway
Ptinus tectus images at Coleoptera.org 

tectus
Household pest insects
Beetles of Australia
Cosmopolitan arthropods
Beetles described in 1856
Taxa named by Anatole Auguste Boieldieu
Beetles of Europe